Lazzate Maralbayeva (born March 24, 1951) is a French painter and architect born in Kokshetau, Kazakhstan. Lazzate is known for her paintings that primarily features expressionism, figuration, abstract and portraiture. She has completed AASI in 1976 and graduated in 1988. Lazzate's paintings are in private and public collections in Germany, Belgium, France, Great Britain, Italy, Israel, Kazakhstan, Luxembourg, Russia, Turkey, United States and Yugoslavia.

Biography
Lazzate received her the architect’s degree in 1988 and thereafter worked as head architect in project institutions of Almaty city. She exhibited her first exhibition of Almaty Avangarde in 1989. Lazzate worked as a teacher in the Institute of theater and cinema and in the Academy of Arts. She wrote articles for the Soviet Kazakhstan Encyclopedia and created scenery for the modern-ballet by French ballerina Pascalina Noel Audegond. Lazzate also created  a TV Show and short film in 1997–1998.

Major exhibitions
Some of major exhibitions of Lazzate are: 
2011: Salon ART EN CAPITAL, Grand Palais, Paris,
2011: Salon SNBA (Société Nationale de Beaux Arts), Louvre, Paris, 
2011: Exposition Internationale de l’Association, Hommage à J.F.Millet, Osaka, Aitchi, Toyama, Japan,
2009: Salon AIEL Academie International l’Ecole de la Loire,  Blois (Médaille  de bronze),
2008: Galerie Thuillier, Paris,
2007: L'Atelier d’ete,  Toulouse, France,
2007: Les Attirances (Attraction), Almaty.

She was also featured in following exhibitions between 1989-2006:
Alliance Francaise, Almaty,
Galerie Le Depot Matignon, Paris,
Decouverte du Kazakhstan, Luxembourg,
Galerie Art et Actualite, Paris,
Furore INN Resort, Furore, Italy,
Minori incontra l‘Oriente, Minori, Italy,
Musee des Arts plastiques, Almaty,
Centre CIAS, Rome, Italy,
Les journees du Kazakhstan a Bonn et Francfort, Allemagne,
Le Monde turque, Kazan,
Premiere exposition officiele de l’Avangarde d’Almaty.

Paintings
Some of her recent paintings are

ARU, 2013
Jeanne, 2013
Concert, 2012
Meditation, 2012
Floor Vibrations, 2012
Dance, 2011
Race, 2009
Cell, 2009 
Nomads, 2006
Song, 2006
Balcony, 2006
Matisse, 2006
Entertainment, February 2006
NU, January 2003
Jazz, 1998
Adriatico, 1995
Marilyn1
Paris Défense
Girl with flower
Faces
Spring
Summer 09_1
Marilyn Part_bleu
Cello
Reveuse
Song
Furore Wed Vertical
Urban Night
Grande Nue
The Girl-Fleure
Park. Promenade.
The Girl With The Guitar
Samal Almaty
Venus Almaty
Space Rose

References

20th-century French painters
21st-century French painters
1951 births
Living people
People from Kokshetau
Soviet painters
Kazakhstani women painters
20th-century Kazakhstani painters
Kazakhstani emigrants to France